In meteorology the Ellrod index is a technique for forecasting clear-air turbulence (CAT). It is calculated based on the product of horizontal deformation and vertical wind shear derived from numerical model forecast winds aloft.  

The deformation predictors are calculated using following information.
 Shearing deformation:
 .
 Stretching deformation: 
 . 
Where u and v are horizontal components of the wind.
 Total deformation equals to:
 .
 Convergence:
 
 Vertical wind shear:
 
 	
And the resulting index is given by:
 

To correspond to clear-air turbulence pilot reports the following table can be used:

See also
 Aviation Weather Center

External links
 Aviation Weather Center Ellrod Forecast 

Meteorological indices
Turbulence